RNA-binding motif protein, Y chromosome, family 1 member A1/C is a protein that in humans is encoded by the RBMY1A1 gene.

This gene encodes a protein containing an RNA-binding motif in the N-terminus and four SRGY (serine, arginine, glycine, tyrosine) boxes in the C-terminus. Multiple copies of this gene are found in the AZFb azoospermia factor region of chromosome Y and the encoded protein is thought to be involved in spermatogenesis. Most copies of this locus are pseudogenes, although six highly similar copies have full-length ORFs and are considered functional. Four functional copies of this gene are found within inverted repeat IR2; two functional copies of this gene are found in palindrome P3, along with two copies of PTPN13-like, Y-linked. Alternative splicing of transcripts results in two transcript variants that encode different proteins.

References

Further reading